Captain Gallant of the Foreign Legion is an American half-hour black-and-white television series about the French Foreign Legion starring Buster Crabbe in the title role. Crabbe's real-life son Cullen Crabbe played the Legion mascot, with cowboy sidekick Fuzzy Knight playing himself as Legion comedy relief. The series premiered on NBC on 13 February 1955 and ended its first run with the 65th episode shown on 7 December 1957. It was shown for many years in syndication on American television under the title Foreign Legionnaire.

Production 
The first season of the television show was filmed on location in French Morocco with many actual Legionnaires and their installations featuring in the show. With increased danger to the crew, the series moved to Italy. The studio was one owned by Sophia Loren and was just outside the gates of the US Army base, Camp Darby, near Pisa. One of the producers of the show was Harry Saltzman.

The series episodes were almost like Westerns updated to French North Africa. The French Foreign Legion genre of films continued to be as popular in the 1950s as it did in the days of silents, and during the 1930s and 1940s.

Three episodes were spliced together as a film released in the United Kingdom called Desert Outpost (1954) directed by Sam Newfield.

Tie-ins 
 Four issues of an American comic book published by Charlton Comics, intended as a promotion by the H. J. Heinz Company.
 A playset by Louis Marx and Company containing a metal fort, palm trees, tents, and accessories, and figures of Buster and Cullen Crabbe as well as Legionnaires and Arab figures.
 The Captain Gallant Adventure Game was a 1955 board game.

References

External links
 

1955 American television series debuts
1957 American television series endings
American adventure television series
NBC original programming
Black-and-white American television shows
French Foreign Legion in popular culture